Thomas W. Dortch Jr. (April 12, 1950 – February 15, 2023) was an American businessman and civil rights leader.

Career 
Active in the Georgia Democratic Party, Dortch become its first associate director in 1974. He was the first black man to become chief administrator for a U.S. Senator when he took on this job for Sam Nunn.

Dortch was chairman of 100 Black Men of America and chaired their board of directors. Their headquarters is named in his honor. He was also a former chairman of the National Coalition on Black Civil Participation (NCBCP).

Dortch was the founder of the National Black College Alumni Hall of Fame Foundation, Inc. He co-founded the Georgia Association of Minority Entrepreneurs (GAME) and the Greater Atlanta Economic Alliance. 

Dortch was the chairman and CEO of TWD, Inc. He also served as CEO of the Atlanta Transportation Systems, Inc., chairman and CEO of Cornerstone Parking, chairman of Lancor Parking Management, LLC, and managing partner of FAD Consulting, LLC. 

Dortch was a Florida A&M University Trustee.

Death 
Dortch died of pancreatic cancer on February 15, 2023, at the age of 72.

Recognition and honors 
Dortch received the Presidential Citation for volunteerism by President George Bush and the Martin Luther King, Jr. Distinguished Service Award. 

In 2022, the City of Atlanta designated a Thomas W. Dortch Jr. Day to take place on November 7 each year.

References 

1950 births
2023 deaths
20th-century African-American people
African-American businesspeople
Georgia  (U.S. state) Democrats
Florida A&M University people
Deaths from pancreatic cancer